Ogbuehi is a surname. Notable people with the surname include:

 Cedric Ogbuehi (born 1992), American football offensive tackle
 Emmanuel Ogbuehi (born 1990), American football tight end